The Pistol Star is an extremely luminous blue hypergiant star, one of the most luminous and massive known in the Milky Way. It is one of many massive young stars in the Quintuplet cluster in the Galactic Center region. The star owes its name to the shape of the Pistol Nebula, which it illuminates. It is located approximately 25,000 light-years from Earth in the direction of Sagittarius. The star has a large mass comparable to V4998 Sagittarii and a luminosity 3.3 million times that of the Sun. It would be visible to the naked eye as a 4th-magnitude star if it were not for the interstellar dust near the Center of the Milky Way that absorbs almost all of its visible light.

Properties

The Pistol Star was discovered using the Hubble Space Telescope in the early 1990s by Don Figer, an astronomer at UCLA.
The star is thought to have ejected almost 10 solar masses of material in giant outbursts perhaps 4,000 to 6,000 years ago (as observed from Earth). Its stellar wind is over 10 billion times stronger than the Sun's. Its exact age and future are not known, but it is expected to end in a brilliant supernova or hypernova in 1 to 3 million years. The mass is equally uncertain, thought to have been up to 200 times the Sun when initially formed but now considerably less due to extreme mass loss although likely still over 100 times the Sun.

Even so, it radiates about as much energy in 10 seconds as the Sun does in a year.

A close point source has been discovered hidden in the surrounding nebulosity, but there has been no confirmation of this being a star or whether it is physically associated.

See also
 LBV 1806−20
 List of largest known stars
 Wolf–Rayet star

Notes

References

External links 

 NASA Discovery press release, Oct 7, 1997
 Pistol Star Fact Sheet
 Further details on the Pistol Star from hubblesite.org
 "The Pistol Star", Donald F. Figer et al.
 Tim Thompson about the Pistol Star

Luminous blue variables
Sagittarius (constellation)
B-type hypergiants
Sagittarii, V4647
?
J17461524-2850035
Stars with proper names